Şəhriyar (also, Shahriyar) is a municipality and settlement in the Ordubad District of Nakhchivan, Azerbaijan. Previous name was Ordubad. It was changed to Shahriyar on 1 March 2003. It has a population of 309.

Etymology
In 2003, the settlement was named Shahriyar in honor of the notable Azerbaijani poet Mohammad-Hossein Shahriar.

References

Populated places in Ordubad District